Mathias J. "M. J." Scholey (August 31, 1867 – June 11, 1917) was an American businessman and politician.

Biography
Born in the town of Brighton, Kenosha County, Wisconsin, Scholey worked for the Bain Wagon Company and then the Northwestern Railway Company. Scholey worked as a carpenter. He then was involved in the wholesale liquor business. Scholey served on the Kenosha Common Council and was mayor of Kenosha  for three terms in 1908, 1910, and 1914. In 1911, Scholey served in the Wisconsin State Assembly and was a Democrat. Scholey died in a hospital in Chicago, Illinois, following surgery for an intestinal obstruction.

References

1867 births
1917 deaths
Businesspeople from Wisconsin
Wisconsin city council members
Mayors of Kenosha, Wisconsin
19th-century American politicians
People from Brighton, Kenosha County, Wisconsin
19th-century American businesspeople
Democratic Party members of the Wisconsin State Assembly